Koroba is the capital of Koroba-Kopiago District of the Hela Province of Papua New Guinea.

See also
North Koroba Rural LLG
South Koroba Rural LLG

References

Hela Province